Erika Alma Hermina Slezak (born August 5, 1946) is an American actress, best known for her role as Victoria "Viki" Lord on the American daytime soap opera One Life to Live from 1971 through the television finale in 2012 and again in the online revival in 2013. She is one of the longest-serving serial actors in American media. For her portrayal of Viki, she has won six Daytime Emmy Awards, the most of any daytime drama actress.

Life and career
Slezak was born in Hollywood, California, of Czech, Austrian, German-Jewish and Dutch descent, the daughter of Tony award-winning Austrian actor Walter Slezak and Johanna "Kaasi" Van Rijn, and the granddaughter of opera tenor Leo Slezak. Her godmother was Alma Mahler-Werfel. She was born two months after her grandfather died. Raised in Greenwich, Connecticut, Slezak attended high school at the Convent of the Sacred Heart, Eden Hall in Torresdale, Philadelphia, Pennsylvania. At age 17, she became one of the youngest individuals ever accepted into London's prestigious Royal Academy of Dramatic Art, later graduating in 1966. Establishing a noteworthy reputation in theater, she performed in Milwaukee, Chicago and Houston.

One Life to Live

In 1971, Slezak auditioned for the role of nurse Mary Kennecott on the ABC soap opera All My Children.  She was not cast on that show, but the network offered her the role of Victoria "Viki" Lord Riley on One Life to Live (OLTL). In her 42 years in the role, Slezak won six Daytime Emmy Awards, which is an Emmy record for a female performer.

In 2007, Slezak voiced strong criticism of OLTL then-head writer, Dena Higley. In the March 2007 edition of Slezak's fan club newsletter, she stated, "Dena doesn't care about the rich history of the show, which is evident in what she writes" and that Higley "wants to write stories that she thinks are interesting but nobody else does." Ron Carlivati was subsequently made co-head writer, with Higley ultimately leaving the series in September 2007.

In April 2011, ABC announced that OLTL would be cancelled, with its final airdate in January 2012. However, media company Prospect Park licensed the creative rights to the show from ABC in July 2011 and announced that they would migrate the series to an online format. In September 2011, Slezak confirmed she would be participating in the new version show, along with other regular cast members. The Prospect Park project stalled in November 2011, and OLTL ended its run on ABC as scheduled. In early 2013, Prospect Park announced it was moving forward with their online versions of  One Life to Live and All My Children, with Slezak confirmed on board. The revived series, taped in Stamford, Connecticut, premiered on Hulu, Hulu Plus, and iTunes on April 29, 2013 and ran through August 19, 2013.

Other projects
Slezak portrayed Jean Roberts in the 1996 television film adaptation of Danielle Steel's novel Full Circle.

In April 2018, Slezak appeared as Dr. Eileen Jacoby on the Fox series The Resident, in the episode "Haunted". In 2019, she starred alongside Jeff Daniels in the drama film Guest Artist, based on the actor's 2006 play of the same name. Later that year, she guest-starred in the CBS police drama Blue Bloods. She returned to series in 2022.

In 2019, Slezak was interviewed for an episode of the ABC news program 20/20 which focused on the murder of actress Rebecca Schaeffer. Schaeffer had a recurring role on One Life to Live in the mid-1980s.

Personal life
Slezak is married to Brian Davies, and is the mother of two children, Michael (born 1980) and Amanda (born 1981). In 2003, Amanda played a teenaged Victoria in flashback scenes on One Life to Live.

Awards and nominations
Slezak has won six Daytime Emmy Awards in the category of "Outstanding Lead Actress in a Drama Series" out of nine nominations for her role as Victoria. Nominated in 1983, 1988, and 2012, she won in 1984, 1986, 1992, 1995, 1996 and 2005, making the record for most wins by an actress and, along with Justin Deas, is second to 8-time winner Anthony Geary, for the most wins for playing one character.  Additionally, Slezak won a Soap Opera Digest Award for Favorite Couple with Mark Derwin in 2000.

Daytime Emmy Award wins

Soap Opera Digest Award wins

Filmography

References

External links

 

1946 births
Living people
20th-century American actresses
21st-century American actresses
American people of Austrian descent
American people of Czech descent
American people of Dutch descent
American people of German-Jewish descent
American television actresses
American soap opera actresses
Daytime Emmy Award winners
Daytime Emmy Award for Outstanding Lead Actress in a Drama Series winners
Alumni of RADA
Actresses from Greenwich, Connecticut